Calumma furcifer is a species of chameleon found in Madagascar.

References

Calumma
Reptiles of Madagascar
Reptiles described in 1880
Taxa named by Léon Vaillant
Taxa named by Alfred Grandidier